Quala S.A. is a multi-national massive production enterprise that creates and distributes food, beverages, personal care products, ice-based desserts, and candies, among others. Its headquarters is located in Bogotá (Colombia) operating also in Mexico, Dominican Republic, Ecuador, Peru and Venezuela.

History
In 1980, Michael de Rhodes founded Quala in a small warehouse in Bogotá. There, a group of 7 people started the production of Instacrem. Today it is one of the most important companies in Colombia with its variety of products for daily use or consumption.

Products
 Colombia: InstaCrem, BatiCrema, Batilado, Quipitos, Hogareña, La Sopera, Frutiño, Gelatina Frutiño, Gallina, FamiliaYá, BonIce, Activade, Del Fogón, LightYá, Ricostilla, Gelagurt, Savital, Yogoso, Popetas, PulpiFruta, Fortident, Gustiarroz, Sasóned, Frutive, Ego, Boka, SunTea, Vive 100, Aromatel, Don Gustico, BioExpert, Nutribela and Cerebrit.
 Dominican Republic: Doña Gallina, El Criollito, Frutimax, Juvena, Disfruta, JugosYá, Ricostilla and SkimIce.
 Venezuela: BonIce, El Criollito, Frutimax, Ricostilla, Savital, Fortident and Ego.
 Ecuador: Aromatel, Ego, Savital, Fortident, BonIce, BonTea, Yogoso, JugosYá, Doña Gallina and Quipitos.
 Mexico: Bonice, YogurIce, Frutimax, Gelafrut, Ego, Vive 100%, Savilé, Suntea and Riko Pollo, BioExpert and Refresco Mexicana con Orgullo.
 Peru: Savital, Ego and BonTea.

References

Food and drink companies of Colombia
Drink companies of Colombia
Confectionery companies
Personal care companies
Companies based in Bogotá
Food and drink companies established in 1980
Colombian brands
Colombian companies established in 1980